Adir Tubul (born 3 June 1979) is a retired Israeli footballer.

Career
Tubul began playing football with Maccabi Ironi Ashdod F.C.'s youth teams. By age 18, he joined the senior side, and would play professionally in Israel with Hapoel Ashkelon F.C., Bnei Sakhnin F.C., Maccabi Netanya F.C., Maccabi Yavne F.C. and F.C. Ashdod.

After he retired from playing football, Tubul became a coach for his former club Ashdod.

Honours
Toto Cup:
Runner-up (4): 2001–02, 2004–05, 2005–06,  2008–09
Liga Leumit
Winner (1): 2013-14
Israel State Cup
Runner-up (1): 2014

References

1979 births
Living people
Israeli Jews
Israeli footballers
Maccabi Ironi Ashdod F.C. players
F.C. Ashdod players
Hapoel Ashkelon F.C. players
Bnei Sakhnin F.C. players
Maccabi Netanya F.C. players
Maccabi Yavne F.C. players
Liga Leumit players
Israeli Premier League players
Footballers from Ashdod
Israeli people of Moroccan-Jewish descent
Association football defenders